"Put Your Money Where Your Mouth Is" is a song by Australian rock band Jet, included as the third track on their second studio album, Shine On (2006). The song was released on 11 September 2006 as the lead single from that album, peaking at number 14 on the Australian Singles Chart and number 23 on the UK Singles Chart. In the United States, the track was serviced to American modern rock radio on 14 August 2006. The video for the song depicts the band performing in a room with an older look to the film, including crackles in the picture that intensify with the chorus.

Track listings

 Australian CD single 
 "Put Your Money Where Your Mouth Is"
 "Hold On"
 "This Night Is Yours"

 UK CD single 
 "Put Your Money Where Your Mouth Is"
 "Hold On"

 UK 7-inch pink vinyl single 
 "Put Your Money Where Your Mouth Is"
 "Snap Your Fingers" (Barbados demo)

 UK 7-inch picture disc single 
 "Put Your Money Where Your Mouth Is"
 "This Night Is Yours"

Charts

Release history

References

2006 singles
2006 songs
Atlantic Records singles
Capitol Records singles
Jet (band) songs
Music videos directed by Robert Hales
Song recordings produced by Dave Sardy
Songs written by Cameron Muncey
Songs written by Chris Cester
Songs written by Nic Cester